Siahbil (also Romanized as Sīāhbīl; also known as Sīāh Nīl) is a village in Gil Dulab Rural District, in the Central District of Rezvanshahr County, Gilan Province, Iran. At the 2006 census, its population was 433, in 114 families.

References 

Populated places in Rezvanshahr County